Boon Lay MRT station is an above-ground Mass Rapid Transit (MRT) station on the East West line in Jurong West, Singapore. Located in Jurong West Central, Boon Lay station is one of the three stations that serve Jurong West New Town; the other two are Lakeside MRT station and Pioneer MRT station. Together with Boon Lay Bus Interchange and Jurong Point Shopping Mall, they form the Boon Lay Integrated Public Transport Hub.

The station was the western terminus of the East West line prior to the opening of Joo Koon MRT station in 2009.

Boon Lay station is proposed to become an interchange with the Jurong Region line, which is slated for completion in 2027. It will be the southern terminus of the Main Branch of the Jurong Region line from 2027 to 2029 before Jurong Pier MRT station opens. Trains entering service at this station will terminate at Tawas via Bahar Junction.

History

Construction began on 6 January 1987 and trackwork was completed in October 1989. The station opened on 6 July 1990 as the western terminus of the East West line, and was the last station to be opened on the original MRT network. Initially, the station had the station code 'W12', which was later changed to 'EW27' on 31 July 2001 when the MRT network map was revamped by the then Minister for Communications and Information Technology, Mr Yeo Cheow Tong. The original name was "Jurong West" before the construction began and was renamed to Boon Lay.

As Boon Lay and Jurong West Neighbourhoods 7 and 8 were developed later, the station had deferred their need to construct the station until 6 January 1987. The last MRT viaduct to be constructed was from Lakeside to Boon Lay on 11 August 1989.

Boon Lay extension (period 1)
The station was built to serve residents living in the then-undeveloped Jurong West New Town and people working in the then mostly-undeveloped Tuas and Jurong Industrial Estate, since it was the only MRT station serving these areas, covering the areas westwards from Boon Lay. As these areas developed, passenger volume increased, leading to much congestion at this station during peak hours.

However, the situation was improved when the Boon Lay MRT extension commenced service on 28 February 2009 with the opening of Pioneer and Joo Koon. With Pioneer serving the western portion of Jurong West New Town and Pioneer Sector, and Joo Koon MRT station serving Joo Koon, Boon Lay now serves only the eastern portion of Jurong West New Town and one less industrial area and ceased to be the western terminal of the East West line.

As with most of the above-ground stations originally built along the East West line, it was built without platform screen doors to prevent commuters from falling onto the train tracks. After several successful tests at Jurong East, Yishun and Pasir Ris, half-height screen doors were installed  and commenced operations on 30 June 2011. The station installed with high-volume low-speed fans and commenced operations on 11 December 2012.

Jurong Region line
On 9 May 2018, the Land Transport Authority (LTA) announced that Boon Lay station would be part of the proposed Jurong Region line (JRL). The station will be constructed as part of Phase 1, JRL (West), consisting of 10 stations between Choa Chu Kang, Boon Lay and Tawas, and is expected to be completed in 2027.

The platforms will be situated over the junction of Jurong West Street 63 and Jurong West Street 64, located to the west of current station complex. The JRL platforms will be built at a height greater than the current EWL platforms to avoid the ingress and egress tracks of the East West line.

Contract J106 for the design and construction of Boon Lay station and associated viaducts, including Addition & Alteration works to the existing station complex, was awarded to China Communications Construction Company Limited (Singapore Branch) at a sum of S$172 million. Construction will start in 2020, with completion in 2027.

Initially expected to open in 2026, the restrictions on the construction due to the COVID-19 pandemic has led to delays in the JRL line completion, and the date was pushed to 2027.

Virtual Shopping
Similar to those at train stations in South Korea, an interactive media was launched on 7 December 2011 by SMRT in partnership with Cold Storage. Using a camera phone with a QR code reader installed, one can purchase the items displayed on the media by flashing their camera phones on the items and the items would be delivered to them upon payment through the various credit cards.

References

External links

 
 LTA – Other Rail Projects
 LTA – New Releases – Expanding The Rail Network: LTA To Build Boon Lay MRT Extension
 omy – 新闻 News – 红衣队铁轨上追捕玩命青年 (Chinese news article. Literally means "omy – News – Red Man Team on tracks chasing a teen who played his life." where SMRT staffs has a uniform of Red T-shirt.)

Railway stations in Singapore opened in 1990
Jurong West
Mass Rapid Transit (Singapore) stations